A foilboard or hydrofoil board is a surfboard with a hydrofoil that extends below the board into the water. This design causes the board to leave the surface of the water at various speeds.

Background

Laird Hamilton, a prominent figure in the invention of big wave tow-in surfing, later discovered the foilboard's capability to harness swell energy with the use of a jet ski, pulling the rider into a wave.

The original stand-up design, used with the use of snow board boots, allowed the rider to glide with the moving wave by harnessing the kinetic energy with the underwater swell. Hydrofoil kiteboards allow the rider to achieve the same result with the use of a kite. The hydrofoil minimizes the effects of choppy or rough conditions. Due to the hydrofoil's underwater characteristics, the rider can angle higher into the wind than on traditional kiteboards which ride on the surface of the water.

Rush Randle, a noted acrobatic surfer and big wave windsurfer, is credited with being the first ever to mount a hydrofoil to a windsurfing board, performing forward loops with the hydrofoil mounted below on the outer reefs of Maui.

In 1999, Mango Carafino, a prominent waterman of big wave Jaws tow-in surfing, designed the first Hydrofoils and brought them to the market. On the Island of Maui, Mango began the development of fabricating hydrofoil boards for riding with the use of a kite. Carafino later went on to fabricate Carafino Hydrofoil foil boards in China, at the Jin Li factory, with the assistance of Maurico Bauldi and Paulo Iannetti. For over ten years, the world laughed at Carafino, calling him a kook for introducing a board too futuristic for the industry to accept. 

Carafino introduced the hydrofoil in 2008 in Frejus, Cote 'd Azur, France. There the French began to race with the Carafino Hydrofoil board, creating the competitive aspect of Hydrofoil Kite Board Racing. The sport later went on to experience back yard designers tweeting the foils to garner more speed when racing. Finally, the Olympic sailing federation incorporated the Hydrofoil Kiteboard into the Olympic class. In 2014 Carafino left the industry, apparently  as a result of the flood of competition and knockoffs of his design.  Laird Hamilton innovated the use of the board riding in swells with the assistance of expert watermen Terry Chun of Kauai, North Shore. Carafino very well maybe the God Father of creating and carrying the sport of Hydrofoil Kiteboarding from the Island of Maui, Haiku, North Shore to the rest of the world from 1999 to 2014....  

In 2009 an Australian Inventor Brett Curtis built and rode the first paddle-in or prone hydrofoil. He posted photos on surfing forums Swaylocks and RealSurf of a friend Alex Budlevski riding the foils in 2013, 3 years before Kai Lenny made surfing hydrofoils famous. Foils are used on wind-surfboards through design development from Neil Pryde Maui, inventors of hydrofoil sailing "windsurfing" boards. Using a moderately sized sail, a foil windboard can achieve speeds over 6 knots faster than the apparent wind. With advancements in hydrofoil design the energy required to stay on foil was reduced to levels achievable by human power alone. Kai Lenny pioneered a technique now called "pumping" in which the rider shifts their weight over the axis of rotation, driving the foil through the water column which generates lift.

Electric-powered hydrofoil surfboard
In 2009, professors Jakob Kuttenkeuler and Stefan Hallström, from the KTH Royal Institute of Technology, Stockholm, Sweden, published their Evolo project. Evolo was a vehicle invented, designed and built by 15 masters students studying Naval Architecture and Lightweight Structures, who received an assignment from the two professors which combined an electric motor with a hydrofoil to create a personal watercraft that was controlled with weight shifting and motor speed. 

In October 2016, Dan Montague former head of R&D at the Naish International posted a youtube video from Jetfoiler showing an electric hydrofoil surfboard (now commonly known as an eFoil) flying above the water in Fiji. 

In 2017, Lift Foils, a small company in Puerto Rico, developed the first commercially available electric-powered hydrofoil surfboard; it went into production in 2018. The board has an electric motor, propeller, and carbon fiber foils and carbon fiber mast below the waterline. A rechargeable lithium battery and electronic speed controller are encased in a waterproof compartment inside the carbon fiber board. Motor speed is controlled by a wireless handheld Bluetooth remote with a trigger actuated accelerator.

After Lift many other companies brought efoils to the commercial market, including Levitate Foils (California), Fliteboard (Australia), Waydoo (China), Takuma (France/Japan), Foil (USA), MSLR (Canada), Flying Rodeo (Slovenia), ArtFoils (Russia), PWR-Foil (France). There are efoil DIY maker/builder communities online.

Use
In 2021 a father and son crossed the English Channel on propeller-powered hydrofoil boards. They covered 23 miles in one hour and 44 minutes at speeds of up to 35mph on a single battery charge, arriving with 4% charge left.

Gallery

See also 
IQFoil
Wing foiling

References

Surfing equipment